Louis and the Nazis is a British documentary that was televised on 21 December 2003. It was directed by Stuart Cabb and written by Louis Theroux. The documentary ran for 80 minutes.

Louis travels to California to meet the man dubbed "the most dangerous racist in America", Tom Metzger. Louis meets him, his family and his publicity manager as well as following him to skinhead rallies and on a visit to Mexico. He also encounters Lynx and Lamb Gaede, being Nazi-pop folk duo Prussian Blue, their mother, April Gaede, and maternal grandfather, Bill Gaede. Louis Theroux would revisit the subjects of the documentary in his book The Call of the Weird: Travels in American Subcultures.

Reception

The New Zealand Listener described the documentary "Louis and the Nazis is the most brilliant TV programme I wish I’d never seen." The Times described the documentary as "sinister and unsettling". The Guardian gave the programme a positive review also.

References

External links

Louis Theroux's BBC Two specials
2003 television films
2003 films
Documentary films about racism in the United States
British documentary films
Television episodes set in California
Television episodes set in Mexico
BBC travel television series
Television episodes about neo-Nazism
2000s English-language films
2000s British films